This is a list of electoral results for the Electoral district of Eildon in Victorian state elections.

Members for Eildon

Election results

Elections in the 2020s

Elections in the 2010s

References

Victoria (Australia) state electoral results by district